The Island of Frozen Seas is the second album of  Thorgal, a  European comic book series, written by a Belgian writer Jean Van Hamme and the Polish graphic artist Grzegorz Rosiński. It was first published in 1980 by Le Lombard under the title L'lle des Mers Gelees. It continues the story characters of Thorgal Aegirsson, Aaricia, Gandalf the Mad, and Slivia.

Summary 
The story opens with a pre-wedding ceremony held for Thorgal and Aaricia. Although Gandalf the Mad has accepted Thorgal, tensions are still high between Thorgal and Bjorn, Gandalf's son, who still resents Thorgal and sees him as a rival to Gandalf's throne. When Aaricia is suddenly carried off by an eagle and apparently kidnapped, the Vikings rush into pursuit. While they follow a mysterious "ship with no sails", which only Thorgal has seen and identified as Aaricia's kidnapper, they find themselves on the freezing northern seas, unprepared for the weather and without supplies. Lost and desperate, they accuse Thorgal of leading them into a trap, and they leave him and Bjorn in a small boat to fend for themselves. Minutes later, they are attacked by the "ship with no sails" and taken into captivity. Once they awake, a crazed Bjorn attacks Thorgal but falls off the boat onto ice.

A starving and exhausted Thorgal finds himself on the coast of an island, where he befriends the locals. They tell him that they are enslaved by the "Lords" and forced to work in mines. From the description of one of them, the Lord of the Eagles, Thorgal realizes he has found Aaricia's kidnapper, and sets off to find him. He is joined by Bjorn, who also survived. They find the Lord, but before Thorgal can find anything out, Bjorn kills the Lord. Bjorn is then attacked and killed by the eagles. When Thorgal takes off the Lord's helm, he finds that the Lord is in fact a woman, who reveals to him that she is Silva's daughter and tells Thorgal where to find her before she dies.

Thorgal enters Silva's palace and finds Aaricia. The palace looks like the inside of a space ship, and also has hallways filled with bodies in pods. When Thorgal finds Silvia, she explains to him that she kidnapped Aaricia to force him to come to the palace and marry her daughter and ensure the survival of their people. She tells him that Thorgal and her are one of the last descendants of a race of technologically advanced people, who left Earth centuries earlier after a massive cataclysm of their homeland. They were forced to return to Earth in search of new energy sources, but their ship was damaged during landing and they were unable to repair it. Posing as gods, they enslaved the native inhabitants of the island and forced them to work in coal mines. Thorgal is incredulous, but accepts Silvia's story after she tells him all hope is lost and he is free to go with Aaricia.

Thorgal and the locals free the enslaved miners, including the Vikings. They leave the island to go back to their home. Thorgal makes a decision to forget about his origins and live a peaceful life with his wife.

Arc significance 
In this book, Silvia tells Thorgal he is one of the last descendants of a group of technologically advanced people who left Earth centuries earlier, after their own home was destroyed in a massive cataclysm. They came back to Earth in search of new energy sources, but their ship was damaged and they were forced to stay on Earth. They began dying of a mysterious illness, and Thorgal was born aboard a sinking ship during his parents' unsuccessful attempt to get off the island.

Silvia's "palace" on the Island of Frozen seas is actually the wreckage of the spaceship used by Thorgal's ancestors on their doomed trip to Earth.

External links
 Official website  
 List of comics, cover gallery 

Fantasy comics
Belgian comics titles
Thorgal